The Canadian Crafts Federation (Fédération canadienne des métiers d'art) is the national arts service organization representing both the provincial and territorial craft councils and persons participating in the Canadian crafts sector.

Mandate
The mandate of the Federation is to advance and promote the vitality and excellence of Canadian fine craft, nationally and internationally, and to the benefit of Canadian craftspeople and the community at large. The acts as a catalyst for projects managed by members in the provincial and territorial craft councils, operating as the initiator, facilitator and promoter of local, national and international events representing Canadian craftspeople and fine craft.

History
Since in 1900 there has been a national craft organization in Canada. The foundation of the Canadian Guild of Crafts in that year heralded the beginning of nationwide cooperation in the crafts sector. In 1974 the Guild merged with other craft organizations and associations to create the Canadian Crafts Council (CCC).
When federal government funding to the CCC was discontinued in 1966 the office in Ottawa was closed. A small band of five volunteers formed a transition board and kept the legal entity alive. In May, 1998, at a meeting of stakeholders in Montreal the future of a national organization was discussed. It was agreed the CCC should be transformed into a national network for crafts under the name Canadian Crafts Federation / Fédération canadienne des métiers d'art (CCF/FCMA). An Interim Directorate was elected. They oversaw the transformation process and conducted the affairs of the new organization pending election of Federation board. The Canadian Crafts Federation held its first general meeting in September 1999 at which time a slate of officers were elected.

Projects
Major projects by the CCF/FCMA include large scale market studies (such as the Canadian Fine Craft Niche Market Study and the Profile and Development Strategy for Craft in Canada) as well as national and international collaborative projects (such as the Craft Year 2007 festival).

In the fall of 2009, the CCF/FCMA spearheaded the largest exhibition of Canadian contemporary fine craft ever compiled, 'Unity & Diversity'. This exhibition of 212 works by 206 artists was displayed in its entirety at the Cheongju Arts Centre in the Canadian Pavilion at the 2009 Cheongju International Craft Biennale in Cheongju, South Korea. Canada was the special guest country for 2009, which had the CCF/FCMA and the Biennale working together on special lectures, presentations, demonstrations, tours, an educational lounge and a special boutique.  Over 300,000 visitors attended the events, which ran from September 23 to November 1, 2009.

Selected Works from 'Unity & Diversity' went on to be displayed at the Museum of Vancouver as one of three exhibitions in a triptych of shows titled 'Art of Craft'. 72 pieces from the original 'Unity & Diversity' exhibition were showcased alongside 'By Hand', an exhibition of fine craft from British Columbia and the Yukon, as well as 'Moments In Between', an exhibition of fine craft from South Korea.  The show was a featured event of the 2010 Cultural Olympiad for the 2010 Winter Olympic Games in Vancouver.

See also
Crafts Association of British Columbia

References

External links
Canadian Crafts Federation

Trade associations based in Canada
Arts organizations based in Canada